R24 may refer to:

Roads 
 R-24 regional road (Montenegro)
 R24 (South Africa)

Other uses 
 R-24 (missile), a Soviet air-to-air missile
 GER Class R24, a steam locomotive
 Ngandyera language
 R24: Toxic in contact with skin, a risk phrase
 R-24 Würzburg, a former military airfield in Germany
 Renault R24, a Formula One car
 Rubik R-24 Bibic, a Hungarian training glider
 Small nucleolar RNA R24
 , a submarine of the United States Navy